Sarath Amunugama, JP is a leading Sri Lankan academic, who is a professor of French and the founding Vice-Chancellor of the University of the Visual & Performing Arts, Colombo. He is a former Vice-Chancellor of the University of Kelaniya.

Amunugama received his secondary education at Kingswood College, Kandy and entered the University of Ceylon before attending University of Sorbonne III, Paris specializing in modern languages where he gained his Licentiate, Master's and PhD. He then gain a DESS from the University of Burgundy.

During his long teaching career he had held several distinguished positions such as dean, Faculty of Humanities, University of Kelaniya before benign appointed as the first Vice Chancellor of the newly established University of the Visual & Performing Arts on  July 1, 2005. In 2008 he was appointed vice chancellor of the University of Kelaniya.

Honors

He was awarded the title Chevalier (knight) of the L'Ordre des Palmes académiques by the government of France.
In 2006 he was made a Justice of Peace by the government of Sri Lanka.

See also
University of the Visual & Performing Arts
University of Kelaniya

References

Sinhalese academics
Academic staff of the University of Paris
University of Paris alumni
Alumni of the University of Ceylon (Peradeniya)
Living people
Year of birth missing (living people)
Alumni of Kingswood College, Kandy
Vice-Chancellors of the University of Kelaniya
Academics from Kandy
University of Burgundy alumni
Sri Lankan expatriates in France